The Forgery Act 1861 (24 & 25 Vict c 98) is an Act of the Parliament of the United Kingdom of Great Britain and Ireland (as it then was). It consolidated provisions related to forgery from a number of earlier statutes into a single Act. For the most part these provisions were, according to the draftsman of the Act, incorporated with little or no variation in their phraseology. It is one of a group of Acts sometimes referred to as the Criminal Law Consolidation Acts 1861. It was passed with the object of simplifying the law. It is essentially a revised version of an earlier consolidation Act, the Forgery Act 1830 (11 Geo 4 & 1 Will 4 c 66) (and the equivalent Irish Act), incorporating subsequent statutes.

Most of it was repealed by the Forgery Act 1913, and today forgery is mostly covered by the Forgery and Counterfeiting Act 1981 and the Identity Documents Act 2010. However three offences under the 1861 Act remain in force today (in sections 34, 36 and 37). These deal with forgery of registers of births, marriages and deaths, and with impersonation of a surety.

This Act was repealed for England and Wales and Northern Ireland by the Forgery and Counterfeiting Act 1981, s.30 & Sch., Pt.I, so far as unrepealed, except ss. 34, 36, 37 & 55.

It was repealed in the Republic of Ireland by section 3(1) of, and Schedule 1 to, the Criminal Justice (Theft and Fraud Offences) Act 2001.

Certain kinds of forgery used to be high treason until this Act downgraded them to felonies.

The Act does not apply to Scotland.

As to forging Her Majesty's seals

Section 1 - Forging the Great Seal, Privy Seal, etc.

This section made it a felony to forge the great seal, privy seal, the Royal sign manual etc.. This had previously been high treason under the Forgery Act 1830. The 1861 Act reduced the penalty from death to penal servitude for life.

This section was repealed as to England and Ireland by section 20 of, and Part I of the Schedule to, the Forgery Act 1913. It was however replaced with section 5 of that Act, which made similar provision.

As to forging transfers of stock etc

Section 2 - Forging transfer of certain stock, and power of attorney relating thereto

This section was repealed as to England and Ireland by section 20 of, and Part I of the Schedule to, the Forgery Act 1913.

Section 3 - Personating the owner of certain stock, and transferring or receiving or endeavouring to transfer or receive the dividends

This section was repealed by section 33(3) of, and Part I of the Schedule 3 to, the Theft Act 1968.

Section 4 - Forging attestation to power of attorney for transfer of  stock etc.

This section was repealed as to England and Ireland by section 20 of, and Part I of the Schedule to, the Forgery Act 1913.

Section 5 - Making false entries in the books of the public funds

This section was repealed by the Forgery and Counterfeiting Act 1981.

Section 6 - Clerks of the Bank making out false dividend warrants

This section was repealed by the Forgery and Counterfeiting Act 1981.

As to forging India bonds

Section 7 - Forging an East India Bond

This section was repealed as to England and Ireland by section 20 of, and Part I of the Schedule to, the Forgery Act 1913.

As to forging exchequer bills etc

Section 8 - Forging exchequer bills, bonds and debentures etc.

This section was repealed as to England and Ireland by section 20 of, and Part I of the Schedule to, the Forgery Act 1913.

Section 9 - Making plates etc. in imitation of those used for exchequer bills etc.

This section was repealed as to England and Ireland by section 20 of, and Part I of the Schedule to, the Forgery Act 1913.

Section 10 - Making paper in imitation of that used for exchequer bills etc.

This section was repealed as to England and Ireland by section 20 of, and Part I of the Schedule to, the Forgery Act 1913.

Section 11 - Having in possession paper, plates or dies to be used for exchequer bills

This section was repealed as to England and Ireland by section 20 of, and Part I of the Schedule to, the Forgery Act 1913.

As to forging bank notes

Section 12 - Forging a bank note etc.

This section was repealed as to England and Ireland by section 20 of, and Part I of the Schedule to, the Forgery Act 1913.

Section 13 - Purchasing or receiving or having forged bank notes

This section was repealed as to England and Ireland by section 20 of, and Part I of the Schedule to, the Forgery Act 1913.

As to making and engraving plates etc for bank notes etc

Section 14 - Making or having mould for making paper with the words "Bank of England" or "Bank of Ireland" or with curved bar lines etc., or selling such paper

This section was repealed as to England and Ireland by section 20 of, and Part I of the Schedule to, the Forgery Act 1913.

Section 15 - Proviso as to paper used for bills of exchange etc.

This section was repealed as to England and Ireland by section 20 of, and Part I of the Schedule to, the Forgery Act 1913.

Section 16 - Engraving or having any plate etc. for making notes of Bank of England or Ireland or other banks, or having such plate etc., or uttering or having paper upon which a blank bank note etc. shall be printed

This section was repealed as to England and Ireland by section 20 of, and Part I of the Schedule to, the Forgery Act 1913.

Section 17 - Engraving on a plate etc. any word, number or device resembling part of a bank note or bill, or having any such plate etc., or uttering or having any paper on which any such word etc. is impressed

This section was repealed as to England and Ireland by section 20 of, and Part I of the Schedule to, the Forgery Act 1913.

Section 18 - Making or having mould for making paper with the name of any banker or making or having such paper

This section was repealed as to England and Ireland by section 20 of, and Part I of the Schedule to, the Forgery Act 1913.

Section 19 - Engraving plates for foreign bills or notes, or using or having such plates, or uttering paper on which any part of any such bill or note is printed

This section was repealed as to England and Ireland by section 20 of, and Part I of the Schedule to, the Forgery Act 1913.

As to forging deeds, wills, bills of exchange, etc

Section 20 - Forging deeds, bonds, etc.

This section was repealed as to England and Ireland by section 20 of, and Part I of the Schedule to, the Forgery Act 1913.

Section 21 - Forging wills

This section was repealed as to England and Ireland by section 20 of, and Part I of the Schedule to, the Forgery Act 1913.

Section 22 - Forging bills of exchange or promissory notes

This section was repealed as to England and Ireland by section 20 of, and Part I of the Schedule to, the Forgery Act 1913.

Section 23 - Forging orders, receipts etc. for money, goods etc.

This section was repealed as to England and Ireland by section 20 of, and Part I of the Schedule to, the Forgery Act 1913.

Section 24 - Any person making or accepting any bill, note, etc. by procuration, without lawful authority, or uttering any such bill, note, etc. so made or accepted, with intent to defraud, to be guilty of felony

This section was repealed as to England and Ireland by section 20 of, and Part I of the Schedule to, the Forgery Act 1913.

Section 25 - Obliterating crossings on cheques

This section was repealed as to England and Ireland by section 20 of, and Part I of the Schedule to, the Forgery Act 1913.

Section 26 - Forging debentures

This section was repealed as to England and Ireland by section 20 of, and Part I of the Schedule to, the Forgery Act 1913.

As to forging records, process, instruments of evidence etc

Section 27 - Forging proceedings of courts of record or courts of equity

This section was repealed as to England and Ireland by section 20 of, and Part I of the Schedule to, the Forgery Act 1913.

Section 28 - Forging copies or certificates of records, process of courts not of record, and using forged process

The words from "other than such clerk" to "knowing the same to be forged or" in the last place they occurred, were repealed as to England and Ireland by section 20 of, and Part I of the Schedule to, the Forgery Act 1913.

This section was repealed by the Forgery and Counterfeiting Act 1981.

Section 29 - Forging instruments made evidence by any Act of Parliament

This section was repealed as to England and Ireland by section 20 of, and Part I of the Schedule to, the Forgery Act 1913.

As to forging court rolls

Section 30 - Forging court rolls

This section was repealed as to England and Ireland by section 20 of, and Part I of the Schedule to, the Forgery Act 1913.

As to forging registers of deeds

Section 31 - Forgery as to the registry of deeds

This section was repealed as to England and Ireland by section 20 of, and Part I of the Schedule to, the Forgery Act 1913.

As to forging orders etc of justices of the peace

Section 32 - Forging orders of justices, recognizances, affidavits etc.

This section was repealed as to England and Ireland by section 20 of, and Part I of the Schedule to, the Forgery Act 1913.

As to forging the name of the Accountant General etc

Section 33 - Forging name of Accountant General etc. of Court of Chancery in England or Ireland, or of any judge of the Landed Estates Court in Ireland

This section was repealed as to England and Ireland by section 20 of, and Part I of the Schedule to, the Forgery Act 1913.

As to falsely acknowledging recognizances etc

Section 34 - Acknowledging recognizance, bail, cognovit, etc., in the name of another

In England and Wales, this section now reads:

The words omitted in the first place were repealed by the Statute Law Revision (No. 2) Act 1893.

The words omitted at the end were repealed by the Statute Law Revision Act 1892 and the Statute Law Revision (No. 2) Act 1893.

This section was repealed in part for Northern Ireland by the Judgements (Enforcement) Act (Northern Ireland) 1969.

Other person lawfully authorised

See section 1(2) of the Commissioners for Oaths Act 1889.

Felony

See the Criminal Law Act 1967 and the Criminal Law Act (Northern Ireland) 1967.

Penal servitude

See section 1(1) of the Criminal Justice Act 1948 and the Criminal Justice Act (Northern Ireland) 1953.

Relevant case

R v Mackenzie [1971] 1 All ER 729, 55 Cr App R 294, Assizes

As to forging marriage licences

Section 35 - Forging or uttering marriage licence or certificate

This section was repealed as to England and Ireland by section 20 of, and Part I of the Schedule to, the Forgery Act 1913.

As to forging registers of births, marriages and deaths

Section 36 - Destroying, injuring, forging or falsifying registers of births, baptisms, marriages, deaths or burials, or certified copies

This section now provides:

The words from "or shall forge" to "or of any part thereof", the words "or shall forge or counterfeit the seal of or belonging to any register office or burial board", the words "or seal", and the words "forged or altered" in both places
where they occurred were repealed by section 20 of, and Part I of the Schedule to, the Forgery Act 1913.

The other words omitted were repealed by the Statute Law Revision Act 1892 and the Statute Law Revision (No. 2) Act 1893.

The following cases are relevant:
R v Mason (1848) 2 C & K 622, (1848) 175 ER 261
R v Dewitt (1848) 2 C & K 905, (1848) 175 ER 380 (1848) 4 Cox CC 49, (1848) 14 JP 57
R v Asplin (1873) 12 Cox 391

"Destroy, deface or injure"

See R v Bowen (1844) 1 Den 22, (1844) 169 ER 134 (1844) 1 C & K 501, (1844) 174 ER 911

"Ireland"

The reference to Ireland must now be construed as a reference to Northern Ireland.

"Utter"

See R v Heywood (1847) 2 C & K 352, (1847) 175 ER 146

"Felony"

See the Criminal Law Act 1967 and the Criminal Law Act (Northern Ireland) 1967.

"Penal servitude"

See section 1(1) of the Criminal Justice Act 1948 and the Criminal Justice Act (Northern Ireland) 1953.

Section 37 - Making false entries in registers of baptisms, marriages or burials, directed to be sent to any registrar, or destroying or concealing copies of registers

This section now provides:

The words from "or shall forge" to "as aforesaid," in the first place where they occurred, were repealed by section 20 of, and Part I of the Schedule to, the Forgery Act 1913.

The words omitted in the penultimate place and at the end were repealed by Statute Law Revision Act 1892 and the Statute Law Revision (No. 2) Act 1893.

As to demanding property upon forged instruments

Section 38 - Demanding property upon forged instruments

This section was repealed as to England and Ireland by section 20 of, and Part I of the Schedule to, the Forgery Act 1913.

As to other matters

Section 39 - Forging any instrument, however designated, which is in law a will, bill of exchange, etc.

This section was repealed as to England and Ireland by section 20 of, and Part I of the Schedule to, the Forgery Act 1913.

Section 40 - Forging, etc., in England or Ireland documents purporting to be made, or actually made, out of England and Ireland; forging, etc., in England or Ireland bills of exchange etc. purporting to be payable out of England or Ireland

This section was repealed as to England and Ireland by section 20 of, and Part I of the Schedule to, the Forgery Act 1913.

Section 41 - Forgers etc. may be tried in the county where they are apprehended or are in custody

This section was repealed as to England and Ireland by section 20 of, and Part I of the Schedule to, the Forgery Act 1913.

Section 42 - Description of instrument in indictments for forgery

This section was repealed for England and Wales by section 9(1) of, and the Second Schedule to, the Indictments Act 1915.

Section 43 - Description of instrument in indictments for engraving etc.

This section was repealed for England and Wales by section 9(1) of, and the Second Schedule to, the Indictments Act 1915.

Section 44 - Intent to defraud particular persons need not be alleged or proved

This section was repealed for England and Wales, down to the words "any particular person; and", by section 9(1) of, and the Second Schedule to, the Indictments Act 1915.

This section was repealed by the Forgery and Counterfeiting Act 1981.

Section 45 - Interpretation as to criminal possession

This section was repealed as to England and Ireland by section 20 of, and Part I of the Schedule to, the Forgery Act 1913.

Section 46 - Search for paper or implements employed in any forgery and for forged instruments

This section was repealed as to England and Ireland by section 20 of, and Part I of the Schedule to, the Forgery Act 1913.

Section 47 - Other punishments substituted for those of the 5 Eliz 1 c 14, which have been adopted in other Acts

This section was repealed by section 10(2) of, and Part I of Schedule 3 to, the Criminal Law Act 1967.

Section 48 - All forgeries which were capital before the 1 Will 4 c 66, and are not otherwise punishable under this Act, shall be punished with penal servitude for life etc.

This section was repealed by section 10(2) of, and Part I of Schedule 3 to, the Criminal Law Act 1967.

Section 49 - Principals in the second degree and accessories. Abettors in Misdemenours.'

This section was repealed by section 10(2) of, and Part III of Schedule 3 to, the Criminal Law Act 1967.

Section 50 - Offences committed within the jurisdiction of the Admiralty

The words "deemed to be offences of the same nature, and" and the words from "and may be dealt with" onwards were repealed by section 10(2) of, and Part III of Schedule 3 to, the Criminal Law Act 1967.

This section was repealed by the Forgery and Counterfeiting Act 1981.

Section 51 - Fine and sureties for keeping the peace; in what cases

The words "fine the offender, and to", and the words from "and in all cases of felonies" to "authorized" in the next place it occurred, were repealed by section 10(2) of, and Part III of Schedule 3 to, the Criminal Law Act 1967.

This section was repealed by section 8(2) of, and Part II of Schedule 5 to, the Justices of the Peace Act 1968.
 
Section 52 - Hard labour

This section was repealed by the Statute Law Revision (No. 2) Act 1893.

Section 53 - Solitary confinement

This section was repealed by the Statute Law Revision Act 1892.

Section 54 - The costs of the prosecution of misdemeanour against this Act may be allowed

This section was repealed by section 10 of, and the Schedule to, the Costs in Criminal Cases Act 1908.

Section 55 - Act not to extend to Scotland

Section 56 - Commencement of the Act

This section was repealed by the Statute Law Revision Act 1892.

See also
Forgery Act

References

External links
The Forgery Act 1861, as amended from the National Archives.
The Forgery Act 1861, as originally enacted from the National Archives.
List of repeals and amendments in the Republic of Ireland from the Irish Statute Book

1861 in British law
English criminal law
United Kingdom Acts of Parliament 1861
Forgery